WAWM may refer to:

 WAWM (FM), a radio station (98.9 FM) licensed to serve Petoskey, Michigan, United States
 Andi Jemma Airport (ICAO code WAWM)